David Jarvis may refer to:

David H. Jarvis (1862–1911), American military serviceman and captain in the United States Revenue Cutter Service
Dave Jarvis, American baseball coach